The 25th Infantry Division (nicknamed "Tropic Lightning") is a United States Army division based at Schofield Barracks in Hawaii. The division, which was activated on 1 October 1941 in Hawaii, conducts military operations primarily in the Asia-Pacific region. Its present deployment is composed of light infantry and aviation units. Tropic Lightning soldiers regularly train with other U.S. military branches to practice and maintain joint operations capabilities. The climate and terrain of the Pacific region demands Tropic Lightning soldiers be able to operate in physically demanding and harsh environments. In 2014, the division opened the Jungle Operations Training Center—the first such school in the Army since the closing of the old Jungle Warfare School at Fort Sherman, Panama Canal Zone. Joint operations and training with partner states herald a new chapter in the history of Tropic Lightning—America's Pacific Division.

The division was originally activated from Hawaii garrison units during World War II, slightly more than a month before the Japanese Attack on Pearl Harbor began the Pacific War. After spending almost a year training, it fought in the Allied counteroffensive during the Guadalcanal Campaign from December 1942, helping to end organized Japanese resistance on that island by early February 1943. The 25th spent a period garrisoning the island, then moved on to fight in the New Georgia Campaign in July. After the Japanese defeat in the latter, it was sent to New Zealand later that year for rest and training, before moving to New Caledonia for further training. The division returned to combat in the January 1945 invasion of Luzon, reducing Japanese resistance on the island until late June, after which it was pulled out of the line for training. The division then served in the occupation of Japan after the surrender of the latter from September 1945.

When the Korean War began in June 1950, the division was deployed to South Korea, where it fought in the defense of and the breakout from the Pusan Perimeter in mid-1950, with elements advancing as far as the Amnok River in November. After being thrown back by the Chinese Communist intervention in the war, the division eventually took up positions south of Osan. It participated in a series of United Nations counteroffensives in early 1951, then fought in a stalemate close to the 38th parallel from the middle of the year. The division defended Seoul against Chinese Communist attack from May 1953 to the July armistice, returning to Hawaii in late 1954.

After undergoing major reorganizations in 1957 and 1963 to adapt to changing tactics, the division deployed to South Vietnam to fight in the Vietnam War between late 1965 and early 1966. The 25th served in Vietnam until its withdrawal back to Hawaii in 1970–1971, participating in Operation Attleboro, Operation Cedar Falls, Operation Junction City, the Battle of Saigon during the North Vietnamese Tet Offensive, and the Cambodian Incursion. It was reorganized as a light infantry division in 1985, and elements have participated in the Iraq War and the War in Afghanistan.

History

Lineage
Sources:

 Constituted 26 August 1941 in the Army of the United States as Headquarters, 25th Infantry Division, based on a cadre Force from the former Hawaiian Division.
 Activated 1 October 1941 at Schofield Barracks, Hawaii
 Allotted 27 June 1949 to the Regular Army
 Division headquarters reorganized and redesignated 1 April 1960 as Headquarters and Headquarters Company, 25th Infantry Division
 Reorganized and redesignated 16 November 2005 as Headquarters and Tactical Command Posts, 25th Infantry Division
 Reorganized and redesignated 16 January 2010 as Headquarters and Headquarters Battalion, 25th Infantry Division

The 25th Division was originally formed in the Army of the United States from the 27th and 35th Infantry Regiments of the Regular Army Hawaiian Division− a pre–World War II "square" division composed of two brigades each with two infantry regiments, and the 298th Infantry Regiment of the Hawaii National Guard. The remaining units of the Hawaiian Division were reorganized in the Regular Army as the 24th Infantry Division. These steps, part of the "triangular" division reorganization, were undertaken to provide more flexibility, with direct divisional control of the three infantry regiments. On 23 July 1942, the 24th Infantry Division's 299th Infantry Regiment was inactivated after the transfer of many Nisei (second-generation Japanese-American) soldiers to form the 100th Infantry Battalion left its ranks depleted. The Washington National Guard's 161st Infantry Regiment, detached from the 41st Infantry Division and on duty in the Hawaiian Department, was at first attached, and then formally assigned as the 25th Infantry Division's third regiment on 3 August 1942.

Pacific War

After the Japanese air attack on Schofield Barracks on 7 December 1941, the 25th Infantry Division moved to beach positions for the defense of Honolulu and Ewa Point.
Following intensive training, the 25th began moving to Guadalcanal, 25 November 1942, to relieve Marines near Henderson Field. First elements landed near the Tenaru River, 17 December 1942, and entered combat, 10 January 1943, participating in the seizure of Kokumbona and the reduction of the Mount Austen Pocket in some of the bitterest fighting of the Pacific campaign. The threat of large enemy attacks caused a temporary withdrawal, but division elements under XIV Corps control relieved the 147th Infantry and took over the advance on Cape Esperance. The junction of these elements with Americal Division forces near the cape, 5 February 1943, ended organized enemy resistance.

A period of garrison duty followed, ending 21 July: On that date, advance elements debarked on Munda, New Georgia. The 25th Infantry, under the Northern Landing Force, took part in the capture of Vella Lavella, 15 August to 15 September 1943. Meanwhile, other elements landed on New Georgia, took Zieta, marched through jungle mud for 19 days, and captured Bairoko Harbor, winning the island. Elements cleared Arundel Island, 24 September 1943, and Kolombangara island with its important Vila Airport, 6 October. Organized resistance on New Georgia ended, 25 August, and the division moved to New Zealand for rest and training, last elements arriving on 5 December. The 25th was transferred to New Caledonia, 3 February-14 March 1944, for continued training.

The division landed in the San Fabian area of Luzon on 11 January 1945 to enter the struggle for the liberation of the Philippines. It drove across the Luzon Central Plain, meeting the enemy at Binalonan, 17 January. Moving through the rice paddies, the 25th occupied Umingan, Lupao, and San Jose and destroyed a great part of the Japanese armor on Luzon. On 21 February, the division began operations in the Caraballo Mountains in tandem with the 32nd Infantry Division which fought the Battle of Villa Verde Trail. The 25th fought its way along Highway No. 5, taking Digdig, Putlan, and Kapintalan against fierce Japanese counterattacks and captured Balete Pass, 13 May, and opened the gateway to the Cagayan Valley, 27 May, with the capture of Santa Fe. Until 30 June, when the division was relieved, it carried out mopping-up activities. On 1 July, the division moved to Tarlac for training, leaving for Japan, 20 September.

Casualties
Total battle casualties: 5,432

Killed in action: 1,236
Wounded in action: 4,190
Missing in action: 4
Prisoner of war: 2
The division's rapid movements during its campaigns led to the adoption of the nickname "Tropic Lightning". It remained on occupation duty in Japan for the next five years.

Korean War

The Korean War began on 25 June 1950 when the North Korean Korean People's Army (KPA) crossed the 38th Parallel to invade South Korea. Acting under United Nations (UN) orders, the division moved from its base in Japan to Korea between 5–18 July 1950 to join the Eighth United States Army. The division, then under the command of Major General William B. Kean, successfully completed its first mission by blocking the approaches to the port city Pusan. For this action, the division received its first Republic of Korea Presidential Unit Citation. The division participated in the breakout from the Pusan perimeter commencing on 16 September and Eighth Army then began a general offensive northward against crumbling KPA opposition to establish contact with forces of the 7th Infantry Division driving southward from the Inchon beachhead. Major elements of the KPA were destroyed and cut off in this aggressive penetration; the link-up was affected south of Suwon on 26 September. On 23 September the division was assigned to the newly activated US IX Corps. The UN offensive was continued northwards, past Seoul, and across the 38th Parallel into North Korea on 1 October. The momentum of the attack was maintained, and the race to the North Korean capital, Pyongyang, ended on 19 October when elements of the Republic of Korea Army (ROK) 1st Infantry Division and US 1st Cavalry Division captured the city. The advance continued, but against unexpectedly stiffening resistance. The Chinese People's Volunteer Army (PVA) entered the war on the side of North Korea, making their first attacks in late October. The UN forces renewed their offensive on 24 November before being stopped by the PVA Second Phase Offensive starting on 25 November. The division was forced to carry out a systematic withdrawal and ordered to take up defensive positions on the south bank of the Chongchon River on 30 November 1950. Eventually, these lines failed and Eighth Army suffering heavy casualties, ordered a complete withdrawal to the Imjin River, near the 38th Parallel.

After a month and a half of planning and reorganization, a new offensive was launched on 25 January 1951 and succeeded in recapturing Inchon and Kimpo Air Base. This was the first of several successful assaults on the PVA/KPA. The division next participated in Operation Ripper, during which it drove the PVA across the Han River. Success continued with Operations Dauntless and Piledriver in early 1951. These offensives secured part of the Iron Triangle which enhanced the UN's bargaining position. With leaders of four nations now at the negotiating tables in the summer of 1951, Division activity slowed to patrol and defensive actions to maintain the line of resistance. This type of action continued into the winter of 1952. In January 1953 the division was transferred from IX Corps to I Corps and assumed the responsibility of guarding the approaches of Seoul on 5 May 1953. 23 days later, when ceasefire negotiations at Panmunjom stalled, a heavy PVA assault hit the Nevada Complex, the division held its ground; the brunt of the attack was absorbed by the attached Turkish Brigade and the 14th Infantry Regiment. By successfully defending Seoul from continued attack from May to July 1953, the division earned its second Republic of Korea Presidential Unit Citation. Again, negotiators moved toward peace. In July, the division again moved to reserve status at Camp Casey where it remained through the signing of the armistice 27 July 1953. Fourteen division soldiers were awarded Medals of Honor during the Korean War, making the division one of the most decorated US Army divisions of that war.

The division's 14th Infantry Regiment had three recipients of the Medal of Honor, Donn F. Porter, Ernest E. West and Bryant E. Womack. The 24th Infantry Regiment had two recipients, Cornelius H. Charlton and William Thompson. The 35th Infantry Regiment had three recipients, William R. Jecelin, Billie G. Kanell and Donald R. Moyer. Finally, the 27th Infantry Regiment had five recipients, John W. Collier, Reginald B. Desiderio, Benito Martinez, Lewis L. Millett and Jerome A. Sudut. The divisions patch is sometimes referred to as the "Electric Strawberry".

The division remained in Korea until 1954 and returned to Hawaii from September through October of that year. After a 12-year absence, the 25th Infantry Division had finally returned home.

On 1 February 1957, the division was reorganized as a Pentomic Division.  The division's three infantry regiments (the 14th, 27th and 35th) were inactivated, with their elements reorganized into five infantry battle groups (the 1-14 IN, 1-27 IN, 1-35 IN, 2-19 IN and the 2-21 IN).

In August 1963, the division was reorganized as a Reorganization Objective Army Division (ROAD).  Three Brigade Headquarters were activated and Infantry units were reorganized into battalions.

Vietnam War

In response to a request from the U.S. Military Assistance Command in Vietnam, the division sent 100 helicopter door-gunners to South Vietnam in early 1963. By August 1965, further division involvement in the coming Vietnam War included the deployment of Company C, 65th Engineer Battalion, to South Vietnam to assist in the construction of port facilities at Cam Ranh Bay. By mid-1965, 2,200 men of the Tropic Lightning Division were involved in Vietnam. The division was again ordered to contribute combat forces in December of that year. Its resupply regiment, the 467th, was commanded by Lieutenant Colonel George S Dotson through the end of the war.

In response to a MACV request, the division deployed the 3rd Brigade, a Reinforced Task Force, with 5,150 infantrymen and 9,000 tons of equipment from Hawaii in 25 days to the Northwest sector of South Vietnam to firmly establish a fortified enclave from which the division could operate. Operation Blue Light was the largest and longest airlift of personnel and cargo into a combat zone in military history before Operation Desert Shield. The brigade deployed its first soldiers from Hickam Air Force Base, Honolulu, to the central highlands at Pleiku. These men arrived in Vietnam 24 December 1965. By mid-January, the deployment operation was complete — giving combat planners in Vietnam a favorable balance of power. The 25th Infantry Division had its headquarters at Củ Chi Base Camp, near the Iron Triangle from January 1966 until February 1970. The division was heavily engaged from April 1966 until 1972 throughout the area of operations in Southeast Asia. During this period, Tropic Lightning soldiers fought in some of the toughest battles of the war including Operation Junction City.

During the Tet offensives of 1968 and 1969, Tropic Lightning soldiers were instrumental in defending the besieged city of Saigon.  From May through June 1970, division soldiers participated in Allied thrusts deep into enemy sanctuaries located in Cambodia. In these Incursion operations, the division units confiscated thousands of tons of supplies and hundreds of weapons. This operation crippled the Cambodian-based efforts against American units. Following its return from Cambodia to South Vietnam, the division resumed its place in the Vietnamization Program. The war was winding down. By late December 1970, elements of the 25th Infantry Division were able to begin redeployment to Schofield Barracks. Second Brigade was the last element of the division to depart Vietnam. It arrived at Ft Lewis, Washington in the early days of May 1971. Some elements in the 2nd Brigade were originally assigned to the 4th Infantry Division when they arrived in Vietnam. During the war in Vietnam, 22 Medals of Honor were awarded to Tropic Lightning soldiers.

Reorganization and light infantry status
After its return to Schofield Barracks, the 25th Infantry Division remained the only Army division to have never been stationed in the continental United States. In a time of overall military downsizing, it was reduced to a single brigade numbering 4,000 men. The division was reactivated in March 1972. It was reorganized to include as a "roundout" brigade the 29th Infantry Brigade of the Hawaii Army National Guard which included: the 2nd Battalion, 299th Infantry, Hawaii Army National Guard; 100th Battalion, 442d Infantry, US Army Reserve; and the 1st Battalion, 184th Infantry California Army National Guard. Now reorganized, the 25th Infantry Division trained for the next eight years throughout the Pacific Theater and continued to improve its combat capabilities with troop deployment varying in size from squads, who participated in training missions with Fijian forces, to exercises as large as Team Spirit, where more than 5,000 divisional troops and 1,700 pieces of equipment were airlifted to South Korea for this annual exercise.

In 1985, the division began its reorganization from a conventional infantry division to a light infantry division. The four primary characteristics of this new light infantry division were to be: mission flexibility, rapid deployment and combat readiness at 100 percent strength with a Pacific Basin orientation. Major configuration changes included the addition of a third infantry brigade, an additional direct-support artillery battalion and the expansion of the combat aviation battalion to a brigade-sized unit. With the transfer of large quantities of heavy equipment, the 25th Infantry Division earned the designation "light" — the reorganization was completed by 1 October 1986. Training became more sophisticated and more intense. In 1988, the division's first battalions participated in rotations at the Joint Readiness Training Center, Fort Chaffee, Arkansas. This training center provides the most realistic training available to light forces in the Army. Coupled with joint/combined training exercises Cobra Gold in Thailand, Kangaroo in Australia and Orient Shield in Japan, the division's demanding exercise schedule significantly increased the division's fighting capabilities. Until 1993 Operation Team Spirit in Korea remained the division's largest annual maneuver exercise, involving more than half of the division's strength.

Organization 1989 

At the end of the Cold War the division was organized as follows:

 25th Infantry Division (Light), Schofield Barracks, Hawaii
 Headquarters & Headquarters Company
 1st Brigade
 Headquarters & Headquarters Company
 5th Battalion, 14th Infantry
 3rd Battalion, 21st Infantry
 1st Battalion, 27th Infantry
 2nd Brigade
 Headquarters & Headquarters Company
 1st Battalion, 14th Infantry
 1st Battalion, 21st Infantry
 4th Battalion, 22nd Infantry
 3rd Brigade
 Headquarters & Headquarters Company
 3rd Battalion, 22nd Infantry
 4th Battalion, 27th Infantry
 4th Battalion, 87th Infantry
 Aviation Brigade
 Headquarters & Headquarters Company
 5th Squadron, 9th Cavalry (Reconnaissance)
 1st Battalion, 25th Aviation (Attack)
 Company F, 25th Aviation (General Support)
 Company G, 25th Aviation (Assault)
 Division Artillery
 Headquarters & Headquarters Battery
 3rd Battalion, 7th Field Artillery (18 × M102 105mm towed howitzer)
 1st Battalion, 8th Field Artillery (attached 18 x M198 155mm towed howitzer unit)
 7th Battalion, 8th Field Artillery (18 × M102 105mm towed howitzer)
 2nd Battalion, 11th Field Artillery (18 × M102 105mm towed howitzer)
 Battery F, 7th Field Artillery (8 × M198 155mm towed howitzer)
 Division Support Command
 Headquarters & Headquarters Company
 25th Medical Battalion
 25th Supply & Transportation Battalion
 725th Maintenance Battalion
 Company H, 25th Aviation (Aviation Intermediate Maintenance)
 1st Battalion, 62nd Air Defense Artillery
 65th Engineer Battalion
 125th Signal Battalion
 125th Military Intelligence Battalion
 25th Military Police Company
 71st Chemical Company
 25th Infantry Division Band

Desert Storm and the Post-Cold War era
Not many of the division's units participated in Operation Desert Storm, due to the division being earmarked for Pacific contingencies, such as a renewal of hostilities in Korea. However, during the Gulf War, one platoon each from Companies A, B and C, 4th Battalion, 27th Infantry, deployed to Saudi Arabia in January 1991. These Tropic Lightning soldiers were scheduled to be replacement squads in the ground campaign; however, after observing their performance in desert warfare training, the Assistant Commander of Third U.S. Army asked for them to become the security force for the Army's forward headquarters. In that role, the Wolfhound platoons were alerted and attached to Third Army (Forward) into Kuwait City 26 February, where they secured the headquarters area and conducted mop-up operations in the city and its adjacent mine fields. Company A's platoon was separated from the other Wolfhounds following that battle to accompany General H. Norman Schwarzkopf into Iraq 1 March 1991 to provide security at the truce signing. The three platoons returned to Schofield Barracks without casualties on 20 March 1991.

In 1995, the division underwent another reorganization and reduction as a part of the Army's downsizing. First Brigade and its direct support units were inactivated and moved to Fort Lewis, Washington, where they were again reactivated as a detached brigade of the 25th Infantry Division (Light).  Today the division is composed of the 2nd Infantry Brigade Combat Teams (based in Schofield Barracks, Hawaii), the 3rd Infantry Brigade Combat Team (Schofield Barracks), a Combat Aviation Brigade, division support command, and a complement of separate battalions. As a major ground reserve force for the U.S. Pacific Command, the "Tropic Lightning" Division routinely deploys from Schofield Barracks to participate in exercises in Japan, Korea, Thailand, the Philippines, Australia and the Big Island of Hawaii.

Wars in Iraq and Afghanistan

The division did not take part in the fighting in Afghanistan and Iraq from 2001–2003. However, in early 2004, units from the division deployed to Iraq to take part in the combat operations of that country. The 2d Brigade deployed in January 2004 to Iraq and returned to Schofield Barracks in February of the following year. The 3d Brigade, 25th Infantry Division began deploying to Afghanistan in March 2004. The first element to deploy was 2d Battalion, 27th Infantry Regiment ("Wolfhounds"). They were accompanied by Battery B, 3d Battalion, 7th Field Artillery Regiment. The Wolfhounds operated in the volatile Paktika Province on the border with Pakistan in the Waziristan region. The 25th Infantry Division redeployed to Schofield Barracks Hawaii in April 2005.

The 25th Infantry Division is recognized for the first successful free democratic elections in Afghanistan on 9 October 2004. One of the missions of the 25th Infantry Division was to track down insurgent Taliban and Al-Qaeda members in the mountainous terrain of Afghanistan. In July 2005, a 4th Brigade was added to the 25th Infantry Division as an airborne brigade stationed in Fort Richardson, Alaska. It deployed in October 2006 in support of Operation Iraqi Freedom. The 2d Brigade began its transformation as a Stryker Brigade Combat Team while the 3d Brigade began its transformation as a unit of action (UA) in the same year. The (Light) status was dropped from the division name in January 2006. 

From 2007 through 2009 elements of the 25th, including the 1/21 "Gimlets" from Schofield served in Iraq in the vicinity of Baghdad, serving proudly and at great cost. Beginning in 2005 the 2nd Brigade including the 1st Battalion, 21st Infantry underwent reorganization from light to a Stryker brigade combat team. The brigade arrived in Iraq for a fifteen-month tour of duty in November 2007 and was based at Camp Taji northwest of Baghdad. Serving with the Multi-National Division-Baghdad, the brigade was responsible for the rural areas northwest and west of Baghdad with the 1st Battalion operating near Abu Ghuraib. The 1st Battalion, working closely with their Iraqi counterparts, was especially successful in eliminating terrorist cells and uncovering and destroying multiple weapons caches. Select elements of 1st Battalion 21st Infantry, including Alpha Company, participated in the Battle of Sadr City in March 2008. The 1st Battalion returned to Schofield Barracks in February 2009.

As of March 2009, the 1st BCT, 2d BCT, and 3d BCT were deployed to Iraq in support of Operation Iraqi Freedom.

In June–August 2009, elements of the 25th Division participated in Operation Champion Sword.

December 2010 saw the division headquarters and Headquarters Battalion (HHBN) deploy to Baghdad Iraq to become the last Division Headquarters in Iraq. "Task Force Lightning" simultaneously advised and assisted Iraqi security forces, pursued insurgents, and prepared bases and equipment for transfer to Iraqi authorities. On 18 December 2011 the Division Headquarters completed its retrograde, training and security mission and redeployed back to Schofield Barracks Hawaii.

In April 2011, the 25th's 3d Brigade Combat Team assumed control of the most hostile area of Afghanistan, Regional Command East. A few months later the 1st Brigade deployed to RC-South. 4ABCT followed, deploying in late 2011 for a 12-month deployment. This is 4th Brigade's second deployment to Afghanistan.

The Combat Aviation Brigade, 25th Infantry Division was also in Afghanistan, from 1 January 2012 to 1 January 2013. The CAB operated in several key regions of Afghanistan, executing missions ranging from air assault to air movement, resupply and counterinsurgency operations. The CAB's Company F (Pathfinder), 2d Battalion, 25th Aviation Regiment, was on the ground conducting missions alongside Afghan forces. The Pathfinders conducted air assault missions with the 2nd Afghan National Civil Order Patrol SWAT to cut off the export of drugs into the area and keep the weapons from coming into the province. The CAB flew its last mission on 7 January 2013. The CAB, 3d Infantry Division took over 25th's mission.

The 3rd "Bronco" Brigade began their redeployment in January 2012, with the last main body arriving in Hawaii in April. During the deployment, Soldiers conducted counterinsurgency operations in some of the most deadly provinces in Afghanistan, to include Kunar province, home to the Pech River Valley.

Organization

 The 25th Infantry Division consists of two infantry brigade combat teams, a division artillery, a combat aviation brigade, and a sustainment brigade. The artillery battalions are assigned to their respective brigade combat teams.
 2nd Infantry Brigade Combat Team (IBCT) "Warriors" (located at Schofield Barracks, Hawaii)
  HHC, 2nd IBCT
  2nd Squadron, 14th Cavalry Regiment, RSTA
  1st Battalion, 21st Infantry Regiment "Gimlets"
  1st Battalion, 27th Infantry Regiment
  1st Battalion, 151st Infantry Regiment (IN NG)
  2nd Battalion, 11th FAR
  65th BEB
  225th BSB

3rd Infantry Brigade Combat Team (IBCT) "Broncos" (located at Schofield Barracks, Hawaii) Transformed from Stryker BCT, transferring the Strykers to the National Guard. 
  HHC, 3rd IBCT "Horsemen"
  3rd Squadron, 4th Cavalry Regiment "Raider"
  2nd Battalion, 27th Infantry Regiment "Wolfhounds"
  2nd Battalion, 35th Infantry Regiment "Cacti"
  100th Battalion, 442nd Infantry Regiment, Army Reserve (Associate Unit)
  3rd Battalion, 7th FAR "Steel"
  29th BEB "Wayfinders"
  325th BSB "Mustangs"
 25th Infantry Division Artillery (DIVARTY) "Tropic Thunder" (NOTE: The brigade's artillery battalions are under DIVARTY for training and readiness in garrison but remain organic to their respective BCTs.) (Located at Schofield Barracks, Hawaii)
 Headquarters and Headquarters Battery (HHB), 25th Infantry Division Artillery

Combat Aviation Brigade (CAB) (located at Wheeler AAF, Hawaii)
  HHC, Combat Aviation Brigade
  2nd Squadron, 6th Cavalry Regiment (AH-64) "Lightning Horse"
  1st Battalion, 25th Aviation Regiment (AH-64) "Arctic Attack" (located in Alaska)
  2nd Battalion, 25th Aviation Regiment (UH-60) "Diamond Head" 
  3rd Battalion, 25th Aviation Regiment (CH-47) (UH-60) "Hammerhead" 
  209th Aviation Support Battalion (ASB) "Lobos"
 25th Infantry Division Sustainment Brigade (located at Schofield Barracks, Hawaii)
 HHC, 25th Infantry Division Sustainment Brigade
  Special Troops Battalion
  524th Support Battalion

Past and present commanders
Source:

 MG Maxwell Murray 1941–1942
 MG J. Lawton Collins 1942–1943
 MG Charles L. Mullins 1943–1948
 MG William B. Kean 1948–1951
 MG Joseph S. Bradley 1951–1951
 MG Ira P. Swift 1951–1952
 MG Samuel T. Williams 1952–1953
 MG Halley G. Maddox 1953–1954
 BG Oscar W. Koch (acting) 1954
 MG Leslie D. Carter 1954
 MG Herbert B. Powell 1954–1956
 MG Edwin J. Messinger 1956–1957
 MG Archibald W. Stuart 1957–1958
 MG John E. Theimer 1958–1960
 MG Jonathan O. Seaman 1960
 MG James L. Richardson 1960–1962
 MG Ernest F. Easterbrook 1962–1963
 MG Andrew J. Boyle 1963–1964
 MG Frederick C. Weyand 1964–1967
 MG John C. F. Tillson, III 1967
 MG Fillmore K. Mearns 1967–1968
 MG Ellis W. Williamson 1968–1969
 MG Harris W. Hollis 1969–1970
 MG Edward Bautz, Jr. 1970–1971
 MG Ben Sternberg 1971
 MG Thomas W. Mellen 1971–1972
 MG Robert N. Mackinnon 1972–1974
 MG Harry W. Brooks, Jr. 1974–1976
 MG Willard W. Scott, Jr. 1976–1978
 MG Otis C. Lynn 1978–1980
 MG Alexander Weyand 1980–1982
 MG William H. Schneider 1982–1984
 MG Claude M. Kicklighter 1984–1986
 MG James W. Crysel 1986–1988
 MG Charles P. Otstott 1988–1990
 MG Fred A. Gorden 1990–1992
 MG Robert L. Ord III 1992–1993
 MG George A. Fisher Jr. 1993–1995
 MG John J. Maher 1995–1997
 MG James T. Hill 1997–1999
 MG William E. Ward 1999–2000
 MG James M. Dubik 2000–2002
 MG Eric T. Olson 2002–2005
 MG Benjamin R. Mixon 2005–2008
 BG Mick Bednarek February–May 2008
 MG Robert L. Caslen Jr. 2008–2009
 MG Bernard S. Champoux 2010–2012
 MG W. Kurt Fuller 2012–2014
 MG Charles A. Flynn 2014–2016
 MG Christopher G. Cavoli 2016–2018
 MG Ronald P. Clark 2018–2019
 MG James B. Jarrard 2019–2021
 MG Joseph A. Ryan, 2021–present

Honors

Campaigns

 World War II:
 Central Pacific;
 Guadalcanal;
 Northern Solomons;
 Luzon
 Korean War:
 UN Defensive;
 UN Offensive;
 CCF Intervention;
 First UN Counteroffensive;
 CCF Spring Offensive;
 UN Summer-Fall Offensive;
 Second Korean Winter;
 Korea, Summer-Fall 1952;
 Third Korean Winter;
 Korea, Summer 1953

 Vietnam:
 Counteroffensive;
 Counteroffensive, Phase II;
 Counteroffensive, Phase III;
 Tet Counteroffensive;
 Counteroffensive, Phase IV;
 Counteroffensive, Phase V;
 Counteroffensive, Phase VI;
 Tet 69/Counteroffensive;
 Summer-Fall 1969;
 Winter-Spring 1970;
 Sanctuary Counteroffensive;
 Counteroffensive, Phase VII

Medal of Honor recipients

WORLD WAR II:
SGT Fournier, William G.
Technician 5th Grade Hall, Lewis
CPT Davis, Charles W.
Technician 4th Grade Parrish, Laverne
MSG McGaha, Charles L.
SSG Cooley, Raymond H.

KOREA:
PFC Thompson, William
MSG Handrich, Melvin O.
CPL Collier, John W.
SGT Jecelin, William R.
CPT Desiderio, Reginald B.
CPT Millett, Lewis L.
SFC Moyer, Donald R.
SGT Charlton, Cornelius H.
PVT Kanell, Billie G.
2LT Sudut, Jerome A.
PFC Womack, Bryant E.
CPL Martinez, Benito
SGT Porter, Donn F.
PFC West, Ernest E.

VIETNAM
SPC Fernandez, Daniel
1LT Ray, Ronald Eric
PFC Baker, John F., Jr.
CPT Foley, Robert F.
1LT Grant, Joseph Xavier
SGT Belcher, Ted
1SG Yabes, Maximo
1LT Karopczyc, Stephen Edward
1LT Sargent, Ruppert L.
SPC Stumpf, Kenneth E.
CPT Pitts, Riley L.
SPC Cutinha, Nicholas J.
SSG Lambers, Paul Ronald
SSG Young, Marvin R.
1LT Warren, John E., Jr.
CPL Bennett, Thomas W.
SSG Hartsock, Robert W.
1LT Doane, Stephen Holden
SGT Fleek, Charles Clinton
SSG Bowen, Hammett L., Jr.
SPC Petersen, Danny J.
1LT Steindam, Russell A.
SPC Copas, Ardie R.

Decorations
  Valorous Unit Award (Army) for 1/25th (SBCT) OIF III 2005
  Meritorious Unit Commendation (Army) for VIETNAM 1969
  Meritorious Unit Commendation (Army) for OIF 2007
  Meritorious Unit Commendation (Army) (1st Brigade) for OIF 2008-9 (This unit citation was not presented until 30 September 2013 by General Orders no. 2013–63.)
  Meritorious Unit Commendation (Army) for 3rd Battalion 25th Aviation Regiment OIF 2010 Order number 225-09 13, August 2010
  Meritorious Unit Commendation (Army) (HHBN) for OND 2010-2011
  Philippine Presidential Unit Citation for 17 OCTOBER 1944 TO 4 JULY 1945
  Republic of Korea Presidential Unit Citation for:
 MASAN-CHINJU
 MUNSAN-NI
  Republic of Vietnam Cross of Gallantry with Palm for:
 VIETNAM 1966–1968
 VIETNAM 1968–1970
  Republic of Vietnam Civil Action Honor Medal, First Class for VIETNAM 1966–1970

Division memorial
The 25th Infantry Division Memorial, which is located at Schofield Barracks, consists of four statues. The first statue was unveiled in June 2005. Cast in bronze, it depicts a War on Terrorism infantry soldier, representing the more than 4,000 soldiers of the division who have served in Afghanistan and Iraq since the war began in 2001. The other three statues represent the division's soldiers who served in World War II, Korea, and Vietnam.

The War on Terrorism statue was sculpted by local artist Lynn Liverton. An active-duty soldier, wounded in Iraq, was selected by the Army in 2005 as the model for the statue. He is shown in full infantry uniform (bearing his surname), looking at a deceased comrade's boots, weapon, and helmet, set up as a field cross.

Depictions in media
 James Jones' 1962 novel The Thin Red Line focuses on a company of soldiers of the 27th Infantry Regiment fighting around the Galloping Horse on Guadalcanal in 1942–43.
 In the 1946 film The Best Years of Our Lives, the character of Al Stephenson (Frederic March) has just been discharged from service with the 25th Infantry Division; his shoulder patch clearly identifies the division.
 The 1953 Academy Award-winning movie From Here to Eternity depicts scenes and troop housing billets of Schofield Barracks, Hawaii, the headquarters of the 25th Infantry Division.
 In Oliver Stone's 1986 Vietnam War film Platoon, the fictional military unit is depicted by its shoulder patches as being part of the 25th Infantry Division.
 The stories in The 'Nam, a Marvel Comics series about the Vietnam War, are about the 4th Battalion, 23rd Infantry, part of the 25th Infantry Division.
 The shoulder patches that the tunnel rats in 1968: Tunnel Rats wear depict the 25th Infantry Division.  
 The film Tropic Thunder takes its title from the 25th Infantry's nickname, "Tropic Lightning".
 Johnny Rico based his book Blood Makes the Grass Grow Green: A Year in the Desert with Team America on his experience with the 25th Infantry Division in Afghanistan.
 In Command & Conquer: Red Alert, the American officers in the Allied campaign's final mission briefing have the 25th Infantry's patch.
 In the FX TV series Sons of Anarchy, John Teller, the long dead father of protagonist Jax Teller, and one of the founders of the Sons of Anarchy motorcycle club, is said to have served in the 25th Infantry in the Vietnam War along with fellow founder Piney Winston.
• In the CBS military action-drama series, The Unit, Colonel Tom Ryan and Sergeant First Class Hector Williams are identified as former members of the 25th Infantry Division by the unit badges displayed on their class-A dress uniforms.

Notable members 

Rapper and actor Ice-T served in the 25th Infantry Division from 1977 to 1979.
 Film director, screenwriter, and producer Oliver Stone served in the 25th Infantry Division during the Vietnam War.
 Country music singer and actor George Strait served in the 25th Infantry Division from 1971 to 1975.
 Track Palin, the oldest son of former Governor of Alaska and 2008 Republican vice-presidential nominee Sarah Palin, served in Iraq for a year as a member of the 1st Brigade, 25th Infantry Division.
Alaska-based serial killer Israel Keyes was a member and served the 25th Infantry Division from 1998 to 2001
Israel Keyes victim Bill Currier was also coincidentally a member of the 25th Infantry Division

References

External links

 25th Infantry Division Home Page —official site
 Lineage and Honors of the 25th Infantry Division 
 25th Infantry Division (Light)—GlobalSecurity.org
 25th Infantry Division Association
 Army Almanac: 25th Infantry Division at the United States Army Center of Military History
 Tropic Lightning Museum official webpage
 List of Commanding Generals by the 25th Infantry Division Association

 Media
 
 
 
 
 
 
 
 
 

025th Infantry Division, U.S.
Military units and formations in Hawaii
025th Infantry Division
Infantry Division, U.S. 025th
Infantry divisions of the United States Army in World War II
USInfDiv0025
Military units and formations established in 1941
1941 establishments in Hawaii